The Deutscher Verband was a coalition of bourgeois German-speaking political parties that was formed in South Tyrol in 1919 after the region was annexed by Italy. It was a merger of the Catholic Tiroler Volkspartei and the national liberal Deutschfreiheitliche Partei. The German-speaking Social Democrats, for their part, joined with the Italian Socialist Party.

At the 1921 Italian general election the coalition won 90% of the vote and elected all four of the deputies that were allotted to the region. The first leader of the Deutscher Verband was Eduard Reut-Nicolussi. In 1923 he was replaced by the lawyer Karl Tinzl. The most important press organ of the DV, until its prohibition, was the Tiroler (after 1923, Der Landsmann).

The DV as banned along with the rest of the non-Fascist parties in 1926. After 1945, the political tradition of the DV was continued by the South Tyrolean People's Party, which had the same leaders, and also used the edelweiss as its election symbol.

References 

Political parties established in 1919
Political parties disestablished in 1926
Defunct political parties in South Tyrol
Defunct political party alliances in Italy
South Tyrolean nationalism
Banned political parties
Christian democratic parties in Italy
Catholic political parties